Fire Station No. 14 is a historic fire station in the South Los Angeles region of Los Angeles, California.  The three-story structure was designed by Earl T. Heitschmidt in the International style and was built in 1949.

The structure was listed on the National Register of Historic Places in 2009 pursuant to the registration requirements for fire stations set forth in a multiple property submission study, the African Americans in Los Angeles MPS.  It was the second of two all-black segregated fire stations in Los Angeles.  According to the Registration Form supporting the station's listing on the National Register, "All-black fire stations were simultaneous representations of racial segregation and sources of community pride."  Other buildings listed pursuant to the same African Americans in Los Angeles MPS include Fire Station No. 30, Engine Company No. 30 (the first all-black segregated fire station and engine company in Los Angeles), Angelus Funeral Home, Lincoln Theater, Second Baptist Church, 28th Street YMCA, Prince Hall Masonic Temple, 52nd Place Historic District, and 27th Street Historic District.

See also
National Register of Historic Places listings in Los Angeles, California
Los Angeles Fire Department Museum and Memorial
Los Angeles Fire Department

References

Fire stations completed in 1949
Government buildings completed in 1949
Fire stations on the National Register of Historic Places in Los Angeles
South Los Angeles